778 Park Avenue is a luxury residential building located in the Upper East Side Historic District on the north east corner of 73rd Street and Park Avenue. The 18-story English Renaissance apartment house, was designed by Rosario Candela who is widely considered to have been America's greatest designer of luxury apartment buildings. It was built in 1931 and is one of the most coveted buildings in New York City. It has a four-story limestone base. In 1983 it won the first annual Excellence in Conservation Award from Friends of the Upper East Side.

The building’s ground floor maisonette, which also boasts its own private, and symmetrical, address – 73 East 73rd Street – entertained legions of New York City’s elite as the headquarters for high-society conservatism with the home’s hosts.

Veronica Cooper (née Balfe) married actor Gary Cooper on December 15, 1933, at her mother's home in the hyperexclusive  coop; the wedding had been planned for the Waldorf Astoria hotel, but the location was probably changed to avoid public attention.

In popular culture
The building has been mentioned in James Trager’s literary book titled “Park Avenue, Street of Dreams”  and Kirk Henckles' and Anne Walker's book titled "Life at the Top: New York's Exceptional Apartment Buildings"

Notable residents
 Thomas J. Watson (co-founder of IBM)
 Gary Cooper and Veronica Cooper
 William F. Buckley Jr. and Patricia Buckley in the ground floor maisonette.  
 Claudia Cohen
 Clifton S. Robbins
 James D. Robinson III (former CEO of American Express)
 Roone Arledge
 Armand Phillip Bartos
 Brooke Astor
 Mark Rockefeller
 Zygi Wilf
 Vera Wang
 Lawrence Herbert (founder of Pantone)
 William P. Lauder
 John B. Hess

References

Buildings and structures in Manhattan